Allen Troy Rice (born April 5, 1962) is a former professional American football player who played running back for eight seasons for the Minnesota Vikings and Green Bay Packers.

1962 births
Living people
American football running backs
Minnesota Vikings players
Green Bay Packers players
Baylor Bears football players